Berevo is a town and commune in Madagascar. It belongs to the district of Belo sur Tsiribihina, which is a part of Menabe Region. The population of the commune was estimated to be approximately 3,000 in 2001 commune census.

Primary and junior level secondary education are available in town. Farming and raising livestock provides employment for 45% and 25% of the working population.  The most important crop is rice, while other important products are cassava and tobacco.  Services provide employment for 5% of the population. Additionally fishing employs 25% of the population.

References and notes 

Populated places in Menabe